Sophronicomimus densepunctatus is a species of beetle in the family Cerambycidae, and the only species in the genus Sophronicomimus. It was described by Breuning in 1957.

References

Crossotini
Beetles described in 1957
Monotypic beetle genera